Daman is a village and the center of Daman District, Kandahar Province, Afghanistan. It is located at 1037 m altitude close to the main road from Kandahar to Kabul, east of Kandahar.

Villages

1. Dayi, Daman District

See also
Kandahar Province

References

External links

Populated places in Kandahar Province